Donald William Carlton Bird (5 January 1908 – 1987) was an English professional footballer who played at outside left. Born in Newton Abbot, he made over 100 appearances in the Football League.

Career
Although born in Devon, Bird came to prominence playing in Wales for local side Llandrindod Wells, from where he joined Cardiff City in 1929, scoring on his home debut in a 5–1 win over Bury on the final day of the 1929–30 season. Unable to oust Walter Robbins from the side, he later moved to Bury, but failed to make their league side and joined Torquay United in 1932 as a replacement for Harry Waller.

He later had spells with Derby County and Sheffield United before finishing his league career with Southend United.

After football
After his playing career was ended by the outbreak of the Second World War, Bird served as a sergeant in an Auxiliary Unit in his local area.

References

1908 births
1987 deaths
People from Newton Abbot
English footballers
Cardiff City F.C. players
Bury F.C. players
Torquay United F.C. players
Derby County F.C. players
Sheffield United F.C. players
Southend United F.C. players
English Football League players
British Army personnel of World War II
Association football outside forwards